Ryan Keith Perry (born February 13, 1987) is an American retired Major League Baseball pitcher. He played for the Detroit Tigers and Washington Nationals.

Amateur career
Born in Pomona, California, Perry played collegiate baseball at the University of Arizona. While at Arizona, he pitched alongside future Tigers teammate Daniel Schlereth. In 2007, he played collegiate summer baseball for the Orleans Cardinals of the Cape Cod Baseball League, where he was named a league all-star, and earned the save in the annual all-star game.

Professional career

Detroit Tigers
Perry was drafted by the Detroit Tigers with the 21st overall selection in the 2008 Major League Baseball Draft. At the end of 2008 Baseball America named him the Detroit Tigers second best prospect, behind Rick Porcello. On April 1, 2009 it was announced that Perry would make the opening day roster for the Tigers for the 2009 season.

On April 8, Perry made his major league debut against the Toronto Blue Jays. He threw a scoreless eighth inning in the Tigers' 5–1 victory.

On June 8, Perry was sent to the Toledo Mud Hens when Jeremy Bonderman came off the disabled list.

He began the 2010 season as a middle relief pitcher for Detroit. He recorded his first career win May 1 against the Los Angeles Angels by pitching two-thirds of an inning.

On June 10, Perry was placed on the 15-day disabled list with right biceps tendinitis.
After rehab in Toledo, he was called back up on July 3.

Perry posted a 3.79 ERA over  innings in Detroit as a rookie, walking 38 and striking out 60. He recorded two saves the following season, allowing 55 hits over  innings, but his strikeout rate fell precipitously, a trend that continued in 2011 and beyond.

After starting the season with a 12.19 ERA through 13 appearances, Perry was optioned to Toledo on May 28, 2011 to make room for spot starter Andrew Oliver.

Washington Nationals
Perry was traded by the Tigers to the Washington Nationals for Collin Balester on December 9, 2011.

Return to Detroit
On February 27, 2015, the Tigers signed Perry to a minor league contract. He was released by the Toledo Mud Hens on June 9.

References

External links

1987 births
Living people
Sportspeople from Pomona, California
Baseball players from California
Major League Baseball pitchers
Arizona Wildcats baseball players
Orleans Firebirds players
Detroit Tigers players
Washington Nationals players
Gulf Coast Tigers players
Lakeland Flying Tigers players
Toledo Mud Hens players
Syracuse Chiefs players
Harrisburg Senators players